Pseudactaea is a genus of crabs in the family Xanthidae, containing the following species:

 Pseudactaea corallina (Alcock, 1898)
 Pseudactaea multiareolata Takeda & Marumura, 2002
 Pseudactaea multicristata (Zehntner, 1894)

References

Xanthoidea